Kingston upon Hull South West was a borough constituency in the city of Kingston upon Hull in East Yorkshire.  It returned one Member of Parliament (MP)  to the House of Commons of the Parliament of the United Kingdom, elected by the first past the post voting system.

The constituency was created for the 1918 general election, and abolished for the 1950 general election.

Boundaries 
The County Borough of Kingston-upon-Hull wards of Coltman, North Newington, and South Newington.

Members of Parliament

Election results

Election in the 1910s

Bell was also endorsed by the National Sailors and Firemans Union

Elections in the 1920s

Elections in the 1930s

Election in the 1940s
General Election 1939–40:
A general election was due to take place by the spring of 1940. By the autumn of 1939, the following candidates had been adopted to contest that election. Due to the outbreak of war, the election never took place.
Conservative: Richard Law
Labour Party: Sydney Smith (Dennis Gordon was PPC until 1939 when he was expelled)

References 

Parliamentary constituencies in Yorkshire and the Humber (historic)
Constituencies of the Parliament of the United Kingdom established in 1918
Constituencies of the Parliament of the United Kingdom disestablished in 1950
History of Kingston upon Hull